Simplicia inflexalis is a litter moth of the family Erebidae. It is found in most countries of subtropical Africa, and is known from Congo, Kenya, South Africa, La Réunion, Madagascar and Mauritius.

References

Herminiinae
Moths described in 1852
Moths of Africa
Moths of Madagascar
Moths of Mauritius
Moths of Réunion